Živan (Cyrillic script: Живан) is a masculine given name of Slavic origin. The name may refer to:

Živan Knežević (1906–1984), Yugoslav military officer
Živan Ljukovčan (born 1954), Serbian football goalkeeper

See also
Živanović

Slavic masculine given names
Serbian masculine given names